The Art of Defense is the third studio album by the American singer Nona Hendryx. It was released in 1984 by RCA Records.

The album peaked at No. 167 on the Billboard 200.

Production
The album was produced by Hendryx and Bill Laswell and Material. Afrika Bambaataa appears on the album.

Critical reception

Robert Christgau wrote that Hendryx "just isn't as talented as you wish she was, and on this follow-up her undifferentiated melodies come back to haunt her." Trouser Press called the album "technically excellent and funky as hell ... also boring beyond words." The Washington Post thought that "Hendryx has stretched her distinctive sound out over six- and seven-minute arrangements, but the melodies are strangely absent and the material doesn't merit the longer workouts." The Philadelphia Daily News declared: "If this were a just world, Hendryx would have Grace Jones's reputation. After all, she's a better singer, an intelligent writer, her dance grooves have soul, her musicians are among the best in the world and she's relatably sensual, not to mention tougher than Jones ever dreamed." 

AllMusic deemed the album "another case of some very talented folks making a very bland record."

Track listing

Personnel
Nona Hendryx - lead vocals
Eddie Martinez - guitar
Bill Laswell - bass, tapes
Bernie Worrell - synthesizer, Clavinet, piano
Jeff Bova - synthesizer on "I Sweat (Going Through the Motions)" and "I Want You"
Trevor Gales - drums
Michael Beinhorn - DMX drum machine
Aïyb Dieng, Daniel Ponce - percussion
Afrika Bambaataa (tracks: 1, 4), Amad Henderson (tracks: 1, 4), B.J. Nelson (tracks: 1, 2, 6), Benny Diggs (tracks: 1, 2, 5-7), Dolette McDonald (tracks: 1, 2, 7), Fonzi Thornton (tracks: 1, 2, 5-7), Fred Fowler (tracks: 1, 4), Mr. Biggs (tracks: 1, 4), Nona Hendryx (tracks: 1-6), Ray Simpson (tracks: 5, 7), Kevin Owens (track: 3) - backing vocals
Technical
Robert Musso - engineer

References

1984 albums
Albums produced by Bill Laswell
RCA Records albums